Jacqueline Ripstein is an artist from Mexico City, Mexico. She created the "Invisible Art and Light Technique" for which she holds two patents.

References

External links

 
Year of birth missing (living people)
Living people
Mexican Jews
Artists from Mexico City
20th-century Mexican women